Veytia is a surname. Notable people with the surname include:

Edgar Veytia (born  1970), Mexican jurist
Jorge Veytia (born 1981), Mexican actor, writer, and lawyer